Markleton is an unincorporated community in Somerset County, Pennsylvania, United States.

History

Philson's Forge

The area was initially known as Philson's Forge; Robert Philson built a Catalan forge, or bloomery, along the Casselman River about 1810. However, the forge was not successful, and it closed about 1823.

Markle Paper Works

Markleton derived its present name from the paper company of Cyrus P. Markle & Sons of West Newton in nearby Westmoreland County. C.P. Markle & Sons purchased 5,000 acres along the Casselman River in 1881 and constructed a paper mill in order to harvest the abundant trees of the mountainside and manufacture paper products; at least 1,000 acres of this land was purchased from the Pinkerton Lumber Company. In addition to the pulp mill and its equipment, the operation consisted of 13 two-story houses for workers plus a home for the superintendent and a boarding house. Unfortunately, the paper mill was not very profitable, and the endeavor was short-lived.

Markleton Sanatorium

The Markle buildings and land were purchased by William J. Hitchman of Mount Pleasant, Pennsylvania, in late 1886 for the purpose of establishing a combination vacation resort / health sanatorium. Mr. Hitchman was joined in this initiative by Dr. Matthew B. Gault of Clifton Springs, New York, and Rev. John Morrison Barnett of Washington, Pennsylvania, who formed the Markleton Hotel Company, officially known as the "Markleton Sanitarium and Hotel Company." Dr. Gault had been appointed the first medical director of the Clifton Springs Sanitarium in 1875. Rev. Barnett was a Presbyterian minister and a financial administrator at Washington & Jefferson College. Some of the other figures who were important to the sanatorium's establishment were William Borland Neel, Emer Judson McElwee, Oliver Perry Shupe, James J. Neel, Dr. James A. Loar, and Johnston Borndallar Jordan, all of Mount Pleasant; Dr. J.C. McClanathan of Connellsville; and Dr. Shoemaker of Dawson. Dr. M. Annie Howe-Anthony, a graduate of the Woman's Medical College of Baltimore, spent a year at the Markleton Sanatorium, during which she was the only female physician present; "The year at Markleton was an interesting and happy one, for there a woman physician was always honored and treated with the greatest respect." Dr. Hugh S. Maxwell, a 1904 graduate of Rush Medical College in Chicago, was an assistant physician for part of 1905. William Page McIntosh, a 1910 graduate of the University of Pennsylvania's medical school, served as a medical director of the Markleton Sanitarium, and Isaac Slaymaker Diller, a 1912 graduate of the same school, worked at the sanitarium as an assistant physician.

The two main papermill buildings were combined into a grand hotel, and the workers' houses were remodeled as private cottages. According to the Baltimore & Ohio Railroad's Resorts and Springs guide for Summer 1905, the sanitarium had a capacity for 150 guests and charged rates from $2.50 per day to $60.00 per month. The Markleton Sanatorium was the site of several meetings of various medical associations, such as the Somerset County Medical Society and the Tri-State (PA, MD, WV) Medical Association.

U.S. Army General Hospital No. 17

After the United States entered World War I, the federal government operated the former sanatorium building as U.S. Army General Hospital No. 17. The facilities were leased on Feb. 25, 1918, personnel arrived in March, and the hospital was opened in April. The hospital was designated by Army Surgeon General Merritte W. Ireland as specializing in the treatment of soldiers suffering from tuberculosis. The need to find treatment facilities that could serve as tuberculosis hospitals likely influenced the selection of the Markleton Sanatorium as an Army general hospital; it was comparably smaller than other Army general hospitals and it did not have space for easy expansion, but very few owners wanted to lease their buildings for the treatment of tuberculosis patients and the military's need was great. On July 31, 1918, the Markleton hospital was designated as one of the Army's hospitals focused on "physical reconstruction" in order to help soldiers make as complete a recovery, both mental and physical, as possible. However, the results of the comprehensive physical reconstruction emphasis were not as successful at Markleton as at other locations, due to its smaller size. General Hospital No. 17 had a capacity for 200 patients, which it reached in August 1918 and consistently maintained until it was closed on March 27, 1919.

The patients and staff of the hospital published a semi-monthly newspaper entitled Star Shell. A fire occurred at the hospital in early 1918. Some of the U.S. Army medical personnel who were assigned at various times to the Markleton hospital included Lieutenant Urban Henry Reidt, Lieutenant Joseph Daniel Rosenthal, Lieutenant J.B. Stenbuck, Lieutenant Charles B. Sylvester, Lieutenant James C. Thompson, Captain Henry Kennon Dunham, Captain Samuel M. Marcus, Major Henry Williamson Hoagland, Major John O. Kinter, and Major Benjamin Franklin Van Meter.

U.S. Public Health Service Hospital No. 47

After serving as U.S. Army General Hospital No. 17, the building then became U.S. Public Health Service Hospital No. 47, beginning on November 22, 1919. However, this role did not last for long; Public Health Service Hospital No. 47 was closed about a year later. Some believed that it was not best suited for the purpose of treating tuberculosis patients, and federal officials agreed. While the Markleton U.S.P.H.S. hospital did operate, though, it again served as the site of another meeting of the Somerset County Medical Society. Eventually, without the flow of people brought in by the sanatorium / hospital, the Baltimore & Ohio Railroad closed its ticket agency at Markleton on Jan. 9, 1924.

Shoo Fly Tunnel

A view of the nearby Shoo Fly Tunnel appeared in a collection of photographs from along the Baltimore and Ohio Railroad's rail lines that was published in book form in 1872 and digitized by the DeGolyer Library, Southern Methodist University. The Shoo Fly Tunnel was daylighted in 2012 as part of the National Gateway project.

Geography
Markleton is located along the southeastern edge of Upper Turkeyfoot Township. It lies along Markleton School Road, to the east of Pennsylvania Route 281, south of the village of Kingwood and north of Fort Hill. Mount Zion Cemetery is located on top of the hill above Markleton.

Markleton has a post office with ZIP code 15551. The post office is on the western bank of the Casselman River, nestled between the river and CSX Transportation's Keystone Subdivision rail line. Across the river from the post office is a trail access area for the Great Allegheny Passage rail trail. This is the only trail access area with parking between Fort Hill to the southwest and Rockwood to the northeast.

References

Unincorporated communities in Somerset County, Pennsylvania
Unincorporated communities in Pennsylvania